Exelastis boireaui is a moth of the family Pterophoridae. It is known from the Democratic Republic of Congo.

References

Exelastini
Insects of the Democratic Republic of the Congo
Moths of Africa
Moths described in 1992
Endemic fauna of the Democratic Republic of the Congo